Steven Richard Antonius van Eijck (born 4 August 1959) is a Dutch academic, economist and former politician who served as State Secretary for Finance in the First Balkenende cabinet on behalf of the Pim Fortuyn List.

Biography
Before entering politics, van Eijck studied economics at Erasmus University. He then became a lecturer in fiscal economics and financial planning at Erasmus University and was an economics teacher at the  HES (Economic Studies College) in Rotterdam. During the formation of the first Balkenende cabinet, he was an advisor to the Pim Fortuyn List. For the same cabinet, he was appointed State Secretary of Finance on behalf of the LPF on 22 June 2002.

After retiring from politics, van Eijck has served as chairman of Bicycle and Automotive Industry (RAI),, chairman of the Economic Development Board Rotterdam and since 2018 as a member of the Social Economic Council (SER). He is also a columnist for Algemeen Dagblad newspaper.

References 

Living people
Pim Fortuyn List politicians
Erasmus University Rotterdam alumni
Dutch columnists
21st-century Dutch journalists
1956 births
Dutch financial writers
21st-century Dutch politicians
Academic staff of Erasmus University Rotterdam